Zimbabwe participated for the first time at the Olympic Games under its current name in 1980, and has sent athletes to compete in every Summer Olympic Games since then. Previously, it competed at the Games under the name Rhodesia in 1928, 1960 and 1964. The 2014 Winter Olympics in Sochi marked Zimbabwe's first participation at the Winter Olympic Games, with Luke Steyn, the Zimbabwean born athlete participating in alpine skiing.

Zimbabwean athletes have won a total of eight medals – three golds, four silvers and one bronze – in two sports. Seven medals were won by swimmer Kirsty Coventry in 2004 and 2008; the remaining medal was the result of a victory by the women's national field hockey team in 1980.

The National Olympic Committee for Zimbabwe was created in 1934 and recognised by the International Olympic Committee in 1980.

History 
Southern Rhodesia (now Zimbabwe) first participated as Rhodesia in the Olympic Games in 1928. Rhodesia was then absent until 1960 when the Federation of Rhodesia and Nyasaland competed under the name of Rhodesia in Rome. Southern Rhodesia then competed alone under the banner of Rhodesia once again and for the last time in 1964. The country thus always competed as a British territory. It was unable to take part in the 1968 Games in Mexico, due to the Mexican government's interpretation of regulations on passports. It never successfully competed following Ian Smith's declaration of an independent Rhodesian republic in 1970. Although it returned to the Games in 1972, Rhodesia was expelled by the International Olympic Committee four days before the opening ceremony, under pressure from other African countries, which did not recognise the legitimacy of the Rhodesian state and threatened a boycott. The invitation which had been extended to Rhodesia was withdrawn by the IOC, by 36 votes to 31 with three abstentions. Rhodesia remained out of the 1976 Summer Olympics after the IOC inspected the country's sporting facilities and groups and found them underwhelming, voting for their expulsion from the committee.

The country's successor state, Zimbabwe, made its Olympic début in 1980.

Medal tables

Medals by Summer Games

Medals by Winter Games

Medals by sport

List of medalists

See also
 :Category:Olympic competitors for Zimbabwe
 Rhodesia at the Olympics
 Zimbabwe at the Paralympics
 List of flag bearers for Zimbabwe at the Olympics
 Tropical nations at the Winter Olympics

References

External links
 
 
 

 
Olympics